Mark Samuel Soskin (born 1953) is an American jazz pianist based in New York City.

Discography

As leader 
 Rhythm Vision, Prestige (1980); 
 Overjoyed, Jazz City (1991); 
 Views From Here, King (1992); 
 Calypso & Jazz Around the Corner, King (1993); 
 Live at Vartan Jazz, Vartan Jazz (1996); 
 Five Lands: Cinqueterra, TCB Records (1998); 
 Homage To Sonny Rollins, White Foundation (2003); 
 17 (Seventeen), TCB Records (2007); 
 One Hopeful Day, Kind of Blue (2007); 
 Man Behind The Curtain, Kind of Blue (2009); 
 Nino Rota, Piano Solo, Kind of Blue (2012); 
 Mark Soskin Quartet Live At Smalls, (2015) smallsLive sl-0049
 Hearts and Minds, (2017) SteepleChase
 Upper West Side Stories, (2018) SteepleChase
 Everything Old Is New Again, (2020) SteepleChase

As co-leader
 Spirits: with Harvie Swartz, Joe LaBarbera, Sheila Jordan, Live at Vartan Jazz, Vartan Jazz (1994); 
 Contempo Trio: with Danny Gottlieb, Chip Jackson & Ravi Coltrane, No JAMF's Allowed, Jazzline (1994); 
 Contempo Trio: with Danny Gottlieb, Chip Jackson & Carolyn Leonhart, The Secret of Life, First Media (2003);

As sideman
 Roger Glenn: Reachin', Fantasy (1976)
 Pete Escovedo and Sheila E: Solo Two, Fantasy (1976)
 Pete Escovedo and Sheila E: Happy Together, Fantasy
 Bill Summers: Feel The Heat, Fantasy
 Bill Summers: On Sunshine, Fantasy
 Bobbi Humphrey: Tailor Made, Columbia
 Billy Cobham: Magic, Columbia (1977)
 Billy Cobham: Simplicity Of Expression, Depth Of Thought, Columbia
 CBS Allstars (Billy Cobham): Alivemuthaforya, Columbia (1977); 
 George Russell: Live in an American Time Spiral, Soul Note (1982); 
 Herbie Mann: Jasil Brazz, RBI (1990)
 Herbie Mann: Opalescense, Kokopelli
 Herbie Mann: Caminho de Casa, Chesky
 Herbie Mann: America/Brasil, Lightyear (1995)
 Herbie Mann: 65th Birthday Celebration, Live At The Blue Note, Lightyear (1995)
 Jeanie Stahl: I'm Just Foolin' Myself, Daring Records
 Billy Novick: Pennywhistles From Heaven, Green Linnet
 Kayoko Miyama featuring TanaReid with Mark Soskin: Best Regards, Sound Hills (1995); 
 Claudio Roditi: Jazz Turns Samba, Groovin' High
 Claudio Roditi: Freewheelin', Reservoir
 Bobby Watson: Urban Renewal, Kokopelli
 Steve Bargonetti: Steve Bargonetti, Qwest (1984); 
 Various Artists: A Jazz City Christmas, Jazz City (1989)
 Jimmy Ponder: Something to Ponder, Muse
 Jimmy Ponder: Steel City Soul, 32 Jazz Records
 Hendrik Muerkens: A View From Manhattan, Concord
 Hendrik Muerkens: Poema Brasilero, Concord
 Hendrik Muerkens: Slidin', Concord
 Steve Slagle featuring Joe Lovano: Smoke Signals, Panorama
 Joe Locke: Inner Space, SteepleChase (1996); 
 Sonny Rollins: Don't Stop the Carnival, Milestone (1978)
 Sonny Rollins: Don't Ask Milestone (1979)
 Sonny Rollins: Sunny Days, Starry Nights, Milestone (1984)
 Sonny Rollins: Falling in Love with Jazz, Milestone (1990)
 Sonny Rollins: G-Man Milestone (1986)
 Sonny Rollins: Dancing in the Dark Milestone (1987)
 Sonny Rollins: Here's to the People Milestone (1991)
 Sonny Rollins: Silver City, Milestone (1996)
 Sonny Rollins: Road Shows, Vol.1, Doxy (2008)
 Sonny Rollins: "Road Shows, " Vol.4, Okeh ( 2016) "Holding The Stage"
 Teddy Edwards: James Van Buren Meets Teddy Edwards, Vartan Jazz
 Carla White: Live at Vartan's, Vartan Jazz
 Compilation: The Best Of Vartan Jazz, Vols. 1 & 2, Vartan Jazz
 Sherry Winston: Love Madness, Headfirst
 Sherri Roberts: Dreamsville, Brownstone
 Sherri Roberts: Twilight World, Brownstone
 Eric Wyatt: God Son, Paddle Wheel (1997)
 Dawn Upshaw: The World So Wide, Nonesuch (1998)
 Ze Louis: Guaraní Banana, Malandro
 Kenia Acioly: Initial Thrill, Zebra
 Kenia Acioly: Rio/New York, Jazzmania
 Deuce: Deuce, Redwood Records (1986)
 Nanette Natal: Stairway to the Stars, Benyo Music (1990)
 Hans Kennel: "Stella," Featuring Mark Soskin, TCB
 SuperNova: SuperNova Claudia Villela, Jazzheads (1997)
 Roseanna Vitro: Conviction, A Records
 Roseanna Vitro: The Music of Randy Newman, Motema Music (2011) †
 Roseanna Vitro: Clarity: Music of Clare Fischer, Random Act Records (2014)
 Roseanna Vitro:  “ Tell Me The Truth, “, Skyline (2018)
 String Of Pearls: S.O.P New York/Brasil, Alfa Music
 Bruce Williamson: Big City Magic, Timeless
 Roland Vazquez: No Separate Love, RVCD
 Roland Vazquez: Furthur Dance, RVCD
 Roland Vazquez: Quintet Live, RVCD
 Greg Abate: Happy Samba, Blue Chip Jazz
 Manhattan Reggae Unit: Come Spring, Pony Canyon
 Manhattan Reggae Unit: Together, Pony Canyon
 Fritz Renold and The Bostonian Friends: Starlight, Columbia
 The Empire State Group: Benjamin Sujesh, Anothen Records (1994)
 Kazuko Michishita: You Can Dream, Kaz Music
 Minehaha: May Happiness Be Yours, Nippon Columbia
 Various Musicians: Keys To The City, Pony Canyon
 Various Musicians: Cowboy Bebop, Victor (1998)
 Shinobu Itoh: Sailing Rolling, PAS (1991)
 Robert Debellis: Parallax, Vintone Records
 Steve Smith: Steve Smith and Buddy's Buddies: Very Live At Ronnie Scott's Jazz Club, Set 1, Tone Center (2002)
 Steve Smith: Steve Smith and Buddy's Buddies: Very Live At Ronnie Scott's Jazz Club, Set 2, Tone Center (2002)
 Steve Smith: Steve Smith's Jazz Legacy Live On Tour, Vol. 1, Drum Legacy Records
 Steve Smith: Steve Smith's Jazz Legacy Live On Tour, Vol. 2, Drum Legacy Records
 Steve Smith: Steve Smith And Vital Information NYC Edition, Viewpoint, BFM JAZZ (2015)
Steve Smith: Steve Smith And Vital Information NYC Edition, Heart Of The City BFM JAZZ (2017)
 Danny Willensky: Back In The Mix, Speechless
 Roger Rosenberg: Baritonality, Sunnyside
 Erik Charlston – JazzBrasil: Essentially Hermeto, Sunnyside (2011)
 Eddie Allen: Push, Edjalen Music (2013)
 Denise Mangiardi: Brown Book, Alice’s Loft Music PRS/2019
 Liza Minnelli: Liza’s At The Palace, Hybrid Recordings 2008
 Kenia: On We Go, Mooka Records

Note: † signifies a Grammy nomination.

 Filmography 
 Gato Barbieri: Live From the Latin Quarter (2001); 
 Calle 54,'' Bluenote (2000)

Notes

Album reviews

General references

External links
 Mark Soskin official website

American jazz pianists
American male pianists
Musicians from New York (state)
Living people
1953 births
20th-century American pianists
21st-century American pianists
20th-century American male musicians
21st-century American male musicians
American male jazz musicians
Vital Information members